The 1966 European Aquatics Championships were held in Utrecht, Netherlands from 20 to 27 August 1966. Titles were contested in swimming, diving and water polo (men).

Medal table

Medal summary

Diving
Men's events

Women's events

Swimming

Men's events

Women's events

Water polo

See also
List of European Championships records in swimming

References

European Championships
European Aquatics Championships
LEN European Aquatics Championships
International aquatics competitions hosted by the Netherlands
August 1966 sports events in Europe
Sports competitions in Utrecht (city)